Phaseolin  may refer to:

 Phaseolin (protein), the main reserve globulin in seeds of the French bean (Phaseolus vulgaris L.)
 Phaseolin (pterocarpan), a phenolic compound found in the French bean (Phaseolus vulgaris L.)
 Carboxypeptidase C, an enzyme